The Rifles EP is the second EP by British indie rock band The Rifles and first non-live EP. Released on 15 December 2008 it features the singles "The Great Escape" and "I Could Never Lie".

The EP was made available in  North America for download on 28 July 2009 via Nettwerk Music Group, although its name was changed to "The Great Escape EP".

Track listing

References

2008 EPs
The Rifles (band) albums
679 Artists EPs